David Michael Dement (born April 10, 1954) is an American college basketball coach who was most recently the head men's basketball coach at the University of North Carolina at Greensboro. He is married to former Southern Methodist University women's basketball head coach Rhonda Rompola.

From Louisburg, North Carolina, he was the head coach for UNCG from 1991 to 1995, leading them from a team with no conference affiliation to the top of the Big South Conference regular season standings in just four seasons. In his last two seasons at UNCG, Dement's teams went 38–18, including a school-record 23 wins in 1994–95 winning the Big South regular season title.

In 2007–08, Dement won his 300th career game when the Spartans topped The Citadel in Charleston. He enters his 23rd year as a head coach with a mark of 312–313.

On December 13, 2011, Dement stepped down as head coach of the Spartans.

Head coaching record

‡ Dement resigned on February 27. Robert Lineburg coached rest of season.

‡ Dement resigned on December 13. Wes Miller coached rest of season.

References

1954 births
Living people
American men's basketball coaches
American men's basketball players
Basketball coaches from North Carolina
Basketball players from North Carolina
College men's basketball head coaches in the United States
Cornell Big Red men's basketball coaches
Duke Blue Devils men's basketball coaches
East Carolina Pirates men's basketball coaches
East Carolina University alumni
Louisburg Hurricanes men's basketball players
People from Louisburg, North Carolina
Place of birth missing (living people)
SMU Mustangs men's basketball coaches
UNC Greensboro Spartans men's basketball coaches